Eurytion  ("widely honoured") or Eurythion  was a king of Phthia. He was also counted among the Argonauts and the Calydonian hunters. The writer Tzetzes called Eurytion as Eurytus.

Family 
Eurytion was the swift son of either of Irus and Demonassa, or of Kenethos and Cerion, and father of Antigone. His father was also called Actor, king of Phthia who otherwise known as his grandfather for Irus was the son of Actor. If Eurytion's father was Irus, he was the brother of Eurydamas, also an Argonaut.

Mythology 
When Peleus fled away from Aegina because of the murder of his half-brother Phocus, he was received and purified by Eurytion at his Phthian court. In addition, the king also offered the son of Aeacus a third part of the kingdom to rule over and his daughter Antigone to marry. 

In the times when the voyage of the Argonauts took place, Eurytion was known to let his hair grew until he was safe at home again. Together with his son-in-law, he also goes to Calydon to answer the call from King Oeneus to kill the Calydonian Boar which ravaged the said country. There, along with the other hunters, they were hospitably entertained by the king for ten days and during the hunt, Peleus forcefully thrown a spear that missed the giant wild hog but inadvertently struck his father-in-law. Eurytion died in the woods caused by that deadly wound in his chest while Peleus then fled from Phthia to Iolcus, where he was purified by King Acastus. Later on, the hero brought together many sheep and cattle and led them to Irus as blood money for the slaying of his son but Irus would not accept this price from Peleus and sent him away.

Notes

References 

 Antoninus Liberalis, The Metamorphoses of Antoninus Liberalis translated by Francis Celoria (Routledge 1992). Online version at the Topos Text Project.
 Apollodorus, The Library with an English Translation by Sir James George Frazer, F.B.A., F.R.S. in 2 Volumes, Cambridge, MA, Harvard University Press; London, William Heinemann Ltd. 1921. ISBN 0-674-99135-4. Online version at the Perseus Digital Library. Greek text available from the same website.
 Apollonius Rhodius, Argonautica translated by Robert Cooper Seaton (1853-1915), R. C. Loeb Classical Library Volume 001. London, William Heinemann Ltd, 1912. Online version at the Topos Text Project.
 Apollonius Rhodius, Argonautica. George W. Mooney. London. Longmans, Green. 1912. Greek text available at the Perseus Digital Library.
 Gaius Julius Hyginus, Fabulae from The Myths of Hyginus translated and edited by Mary Grant. University of Kansas Publications in Humanistic Studies. Online version at the Topos Text Project.
 Gaius Valerius Flaccus, Argonautica translated by Mozley, J H. Loeb Classical Library Volume 286. Cambridge, MA, Harvard University Press; London, William Heinemann Ltd. 1928. Online version at theio.com.
 Gaius Valerius Flaccus, Argonauticon. Otto Kramer. Leipzig. Teubner. 1913. Latin text available at the Perseus Digital Library.
 The Orphic Argonautica, translated by Jason Colavito. © Copyright 2011. Online version at the Topos Text Project.
 Publius Ovidius Naso, Metamorphoses translated by Brookes More (1859-1942). Boston, Cornhill Publishing Co. 1922. Online version at the Perseus Digital Library.
 Publius Ovidius Naso, Metamorphoses. Hugo Magnus. Gotha (Germany). Friedr. Andr. Perthes. 1892. Latin text available at the Perseus Digital Library.

Argonauts
Characters in the Odyssey
Thessalian characters in Greek mythology